Charles II Otto (German: Karl II. Otto) (5 September 1625 – 30 March 1671) was the Duke of Zweibrücken-Birkenfeld from 1669 until 1671.

Life
Charles Otto was born in Birkenfeld in 1625 as the only son of George William, Count Palatine of Zweibrücken-Birkenfeld. He succeeded his father in 1669. Charles Otto died in Birkenfeld in 1671 and was buried in Meisenheim.

Marriage
Charles Otto married Margaret Hedwig of Hohenlohe-Neuenstein (1 January 1625 – 24 December 1676), daughter of Count Kraft VII, on 30 November 1616 and had the following children:
Charles William (22 August 1659 – 18 April 1660)
Charlotte Sophie (14 April 1662 – 14 August 1708)
Hedwig Eleanore (17 August 1663 – 12 April 1721)

Ancestors 

Counts Palatine of Zweibrücken
House of Wittelsbach
1625 births
1671 deaths
17th-century German people